Erin Gallagher (born 18 December 1998) is a South African swimmer. She competed in the women's 100 metre freestyle event at the 2017 World Aquatics Championships. In 2019, she represented South Africa at the 2019 African Games held in Rabat, Morocco.

She competed in the women's 100 metre freestyle, the women's 100 metre butterfly, the women's 4 x 200 metre freestyle relay, and the women's 4 x 100 metre medley relay at the 2020 Summer Olympics.

For the 2022 World Aquatics Championships, Gallagher was named to the South Africa roster in the 100 metre freestyle based on her performances at the 2022 South Africa National Swimming Championships. She was later named to the South Africa team for the 2022 Commonwealth Games.

On day one of swimming at the 2022 Commonwealth Games, in Birmingham, England, Gallagher ranked ninth in the preliminaries of the 100 metre butterfly, qualifying for the semifinals with a time of 59.29 seconds. She placed ninth in the semifinals with a time of 59.02 seconds. The second day, she finished fifth in her 50 metre freestyle preliminaries heat and qualified for the semifinals. Achieving a fourth-place finish in semifinal heat one, she qualified for the final ranking seventh. Later in the same session, she anchored the 4×100 metre freestyle relay with a 54.73 in the final to help place fourth. On day three, she qualified for the semifinals of the 50 metre butterfly, ranking tenth in the preliminaries with a time of 26.96 seconds. In the semifinals, she set a new South African record with a time of 26.17 seconds and qualified for the final ranking second. For her second event of the session, the final of the 50 metre freestyle, she placed eighth with a time of 25.39 seconds. In her third and final event of the day, she helped place fourth in the 4×200 metre freestyle relay.

Ranking thirteenth in the preliminaries of the 100 metre freestyle on day four of the 2022 Commonwealth Games, she qualified for the semifinals of the event. After withdrawing from the 100 metre freestyle semifinals, she lowered her South African record in the 50 metre butterfly in the final of the event, finishing in 26.05 seconds to tie Holly Barratt of Australia for the silver medal. Two days later, on the final day of the swimming competition, she helped set new African and South African records in the final of the 4×100 metre medley relay, splitting a 58.80 for the butterfly leg to contribute to the fourth-place time of 3:59.63.

References

External links
 

1998 births
Living people
South African female butterfly swimmers
Commonwealth Games competitors for South Africa
Swimmers at the 2014 Commonwealth Games
Swimmers at the 2018 Commonwealth Games
Place of birth missing (living people)
Swimmers at the 2019 African Games
African Games gold medalists for South Africa
African Games silver medalists for South Africa
African Games medalists in swimming
South African female freestyle swimmers
Swimmers at the 2020 Summer Olympics
Olympic swimmers of South Africa
21st-century South African women
Swimmers at the 2022 Commonwealth Games
Commonwealth Games medallists in swimming
Commonwealth Games silver medallists for South Africa
Medallists at the 2022 Commonwealth Games